The Royal Northern Infirmary was a health facility in Ness Walk, Inverness, Scotland. The site remains the home of a small facility, known as the RNI Community Hospital, which was built in the grounds of the old hospital and is managed by NHS Highland.

History
The facility, which was designed in the neoclassical style, opened in 1804. A continuous three‑storey facade, designed by Matthews & Lawrie, was added in 1865 and an operating theatre extension, designed by Ross & Macbeth, jutting out of the front facade was added in 1898. A chapel, financed by Lady Tweedmouth in memory of her husband, Lord Tweedmouth, was also added in 1898 and a nurses' home was completed in 1899. It joined the National Health Service in 1948. After services transferred to a community hospital built in the grounds of the infirmary in 1999, the main building closed and was subsequently converted for use as the headquarters of the University of the Highlands and Islands.

References

Hospital buildings completed in 1804
Hospitals in Highland (council area)
Hospitals established in 1804
Defunct hospitals in Scotland
Buildings and structures in Inverness
1804 establishments in Scotland